Ethan Jay Coleman (born 28 January 2000) is an English professional footballer who plays as a midfielder for Gillingham.

Career
Coleman began his career with the academy of Reading, before joining Brackley Town in 2020. He moved on loan to King's Lynn Town in March 2021, before the move was made permanent in May 2021. At King's Lynn he was a "mainstay" of the squad.

He moved to Leyton Orient in January 2022 for an undisclosed fee, signing a two-and-a-half year contract.

On 4 August 2022, Coleman signed for National League club Bromley on a season-long loan deal.

On 19 January 2023, Coleman was recalled from his loan at Bromley and signed permanently for Gillingham for an undisclosed fee.

Career statistics

References

2000 births
Living people
English footballers
Association football midfielders
Reading F.C. players
Brackley Town F.C. players
King's Lynn Town F.C. players
Leyton Orient F.C. players
Bromley F.C. players
Gillingham F.C. players
National League (English football) players
English Football League players